

Results

Green denotes finalists

References
 Official results

Women's 10 metre platform
Euro